A Bucketful of Soul is the third album by jazz organist Trudy Pitts which was recorded in late 1967 and early 1968 and released on the Prestige label.

Track listing 
All compositions by Trudy Pitts except where noted.
 "Bucket Full of Soul" (Bill Carney) – 3:50   
 "My Waltz" (Trudy Pitts) – 3:45   
 "Love for Sale" (Cole Porter) – 7:00   
 "Satin Doll" (Duke Ellington, Billy Strayhorn, Johnny Mercer) – 2:55   
 "The Shadow of Your Smile" (Johnny Mandel, Paul Francis Webster) – 3:00   
 "Renaissance" (Schere) – 2:35   
 "Lil' Darlin'" (Neal Hefti) – 4:10   
 "Come Dawn" – 4:20   
 "Please Keep My Dream" (Bill Carney, Sonny Truitt) – 2:25

Recorded at Van Gelder Studio in Englewood Cliffs, New Jersey, on December 20, 1967 (tracks 1 & 6) and February 8, 1968 (tracks 2-5 & 7-9)

Personnel 
Trudy Pitts – organ
Wilbert Longmire – guitar
Bill Carney – drums

References 

Trudy Pitts albums
1968 albums
Prestige Records albums
Albums recorded at Van Gelder Studio
Albums produced by Cal Lampley